Angus Peter Campbell (born 1952) is a Scottish award-winning poet, novelist, journalist, broadcaster and actor. Campbell's works, which are written mainly in Scottish Gaelic, draw heavily upon both Hebridean mythology and folklore and the magic realism of recent Latin American literature. In an interview prior to his death, Sorley MacLean, who is with Alasdair Mac Mhaighstir Alasdair one of the two greatest writers in the history of Scottish Gaelic literature, called Campbell one of the best living Scottish poets in any language.

Early life
Angus Peter Campbell was born on 29 April 1954 in South Lochboisdale, South Uist. His father, Ewan Campbell, was from Ludag. His mother, Christina MacDonald, was from Garrynamonie. His paternal uncle, Neil Campbell, was a long serving ferryman between Ludag, Eriskay, and Barra.

In a 2009 interview, Campbell recalled, "My first exposure to ‘Gaelic literature’ may very well have been the birds (the curlews) singing outside our house on the moor, or the sound of the cart taking the peats home, or of our neighbour Eairdsidh Beag playing the bagpipes, or of someone singing in the village. I went to primary school in South Uist where ‘official literature’ if you want to put it that way, was hidden between the cover of books and therefore in English. ‘Literature’ was Black Beauty and Kidnapped and Treasure Island."

After attending Gearraidh na Mònadh primary school until the age of 12, Campbell spent his teenage years in Oban,  where he was taught by Iain Crichton Smith at Oban High School. Campbell remains grateful to Smith for having exposed him to international literature at a time and place where such instruction was unusual; William Shakespeare's Hamlet one day, Duncan Ban MacIntyre the next. One iconic book of Gaelic poetry that Smith also used in teaching his pupils was William J. Watson's edition of the 16th-century Book of the Dean of Lismore, Campbell later recalled, however, "But as far as I could work out none of the poets in it was still alive. No doubt this set me subconsciously thinking that poetry belonged to the dead."

According to Campbell, "Iain was an absolute joy as a teacher – challenging, inspirational and funny. I was in his English class from age 12 to 17, and during that period he opened windows to world literature. One day he would bring in an LP of Beethoven and play it then ask us to write a poem in response; the next he might read us the Gospel of Matthew, Chapter 6 – 'Consider the lilies of the field, how they grow: they neither toil nor spin; and yet I say to you that even Solomon in all his glory was not arrayed like one of these' – just for the joy of the words (I can still hear him reading these words); the next day again he would introduce us to Lowell, or Ginsberg, or Arthur Miller. I think I learned two things from him – that poets were alive, and that we could stand at ease next to the great internationalists."

Campbell then attended the University of Edinburgh, where he obtained an Honours degree in History and Politics, and was mentored by internationally renowned Gaelic poet Sorley MacLean, who was writer-in-residence in Edinburgh at the time.

Campbell recalls, "I went to see him with some poems of mine and he was tremendously encouraging and supportive, and remained so throughout his life. I think Sorley just verified what Iain had seeded: that poetry was a great international language and that Gaelic could proudly stand alongside Spanish or Greek or Russian or English or whatever in that great discourse."

Literary career
He graduated with Double Honours in Politics and History from Edinburgh University, after which he worked in the media. In 2001 he was awarded the Bardic Crown for Gaelic poetry at the Mòd and also received a Creative Scotland Award. The following year he was given a Creative Scotland Award for Literature. His novel, An Oidhche Mus do Sheòl Sinn, published by CLÀR, was voted by the public into the Top Ten of the 100 Best-Ever Books from Scotland in the Orange/List Awards. Sorley MacLean said of Campbell:“I have no doubts that Angus Peter Campbell is one of the few really significant living poets in Scotland, writing in any language.” Sorley MacLean (West Highland Free Press, October 1992)

His first English language work of fiction, Invisible Islands, was published in 2006. It was inspired by Italo Calvino, Gabriel Garcia Marquez, and Jorge Luis Borges. The book consists of twenty-one chapters, each illuminating a specific island in the mythic Invisible Islands archipelago. The work draws heavily on Hebridean mythology and folklore and Scottish history, magic realism and a number of other influences. He also wrote a short English language novel 'Archie and The North Wind' (Luath Press; 2010).

His latest work is a collection of poetry, Aibisidh, published Polygon (Edinburgh) in 2011. It is nominated as the Scottish Mortgage Investment Trust's Scottish Book of the Year 2012, having won in the poetry category.

Campbell writes frequently about the Catholic Church in his work. In a 2009 interview, however, Campbell described himself as a Christian socialist.

Acting career
In 2006, Campbell expanded his acting career, starring in the Scottish Gaelic feature film Seachd: The Inaccessible Pinnacle. Although the film was warmly received and drew comparisons to both Big Fish and The Princess Bride, BAFTA refused to submit Seachd, the Welsh-language film Calon Gaeth, or any other British film, to compete for Best Foreign Language Film at the 2008 Academy Awards. Christopher Young, Seachd's producer, accused those responsible for the decision of being "anti-Gaelic" and resigned his BAFTA membership in protest. Questions about the controversy were also raised in the Scottish Parliament.

Personal life
He lives on the Isle of Skye with his wife and six children, and is now a full-time writer, journalist, broadcaster, actor. He is the father of piper Brìghde Chaimbeul.

References

External links
 Angus Peter Campbell official website
 Brave new words - November 2003 interview by Highlands and Islands Arts Journal
 Scottish Book Awards website
 CLAR - publisher website

Caimbeul, Aonghas Phadraig
Scottish Gaelic writers
Alumni of the University of Edinburgh
Date of birth missing (living people)
Living people
People from the Outer Hebrides
People from Uist
Caimbeul, Aonghas
Scottish Gaelic novelists
Scottish Catholic poets
Scottish novelists
Year of birth missing (living people)